Barbiellini is an Italian family name.

 Alessandro Barbiellini Amidei reportedly volunteered to sell a property he owned, a wedge-shaped site on the western peak of the Aventine, for the construction of the Sant'Anselmo all'Aventino church, monastery, and college in Rome.
 Bernardo Barbiellini Amidei was a prominent Fascist and founded a dopolavoro or Fascist workers' club.

References

Noble families